Seema Laxman Pujare (born 8 September 1976 in Bombay, Maharashtra) is a One Day International cricketer who represents India. She is a right hand batsman and bowls right-arm off-breaks. She has played eight ODIs, taking eleven wickets, and played one T20I.

References

Living people
1976 births
Cricketers from Mumbai
Indian women cricketers
India women One Day International cricketers
Air India women cricketers
Gujarat women cricketers
Mumbai women cricketers
West Zone women cricketers
21st-century Indian women
21st-century Indian people
India women Twenty20 International cricketers